A media-embedded processor (MeP) is a configurable 32-bit processor design from Toshiba Semiconductor for embedded media processing applications.

References

External links
 GCC port to Toshiba MeP

Toshiba brands
Microprocessors